Mareva Galanter (born 4 February 1979) is a French singer, actress and former beauty queen.

Galanter won the 1998 "Miss World Islands" and then the 1998 "Miss Tahiti" beauty contest that allowed her to compete for the Miss France 1999 crown, which she won. She also competed in Miss Universe 1999, in which she did not place.

Career
Galanter was born in Papeete, Tahiti, French Polynesia. She started early in modeling. She was not 16 that she was already doing photoshoots in French Polynesia (with Dominique Petras in Bora Bora, for instance). She kept modeling in Europe, where she headed for the "Miss France" Contest. She also modeled for her partner Jean Charles de Castelbajac, designer of his own brand, living in Paris.

Galanter expanded her work into music and singing, releasing Ukuyéyé, under Warner Music, in 2006.

She has released videos for seven of her songs. She hosted Do you Do you scopitone a French TV programme on the Paris Première channel, dedicated to scopitones from the 1960s and 70s. The scopitone is the precursor to the contemporary music video.

To date, she has performed in several films, including 3 Zéros, Les Gaous, The Pink Panther and Tu Devrais Faire du Cinéma.

Galanter recorded her second album, Happy Fiu, with English band Little Barrie in 2008. She worked with singer-songwriter Rufus Wainwright, with Martin Duffy of Primal Scream and with the band Little Barrie. Jean-Charles de Castelbajac supported her with many of her texts. She toured for several months around France and within Europe.

In 2010 Galanter joined the roster of singers touring and recording with Marc Collin and Olivier Libaux's Nouvelle Vague project. According to Galanter's Twitter feed, she has recorded some material for the next Nouvelle Vague album.

In 2011 she traveled to Detroit to work with producer Jim Diamond at his studio, Ghetto Recorders, and recorded 7 new songs, including Western Love, which has an accompanying video available on Vimeo.com.

Galanter's father is Jewish, with roots in Romania and Russia. She and her partner, French television presenter Arthur have a daughter named Manava, who was born on 5 August 2015.

Discography

Albums
 Ukuyéyé
 Happy Fiu

Singles
 "Miss U"

Filmography 
 Vaiana - Sina (2016)

References

External links 

 
 Official Website (French)

1979 births
Cours Florent alumni
French film actresses
Jewish French actresses
French people of Romanian-Jewish descent
French people of Russian-Jewish descent
French Polynesian actresses
French Polynesian beauty pageant winners
Living people
Miss France winners
Miss Universe 1999 contestants
People from Papeete
21st-century French singers
21st-century French women singers
French people of Russian descent
Tahitian women singers
20th-century French women